The Knudsen layer, also known as evaporation layer, is the thin layer of vapor near a liquid or solid. It is named after Danish physicist Martin Knudsen (1871–1949).

Definition
At the interface of a vapor and a liquid/solid, the gas interaction with the liquid/solid dominates the gas behavior, and the gas is, very locally, not in equilibrium. This region, several mean free path lengths thick, is called the Knudsen layer.

Knudsen layer thickness

,

Applications
One of the applications of Knudsen layer is in the coma of comets. It has been used specially in the coma chemistry model (ComChem model).

References

Fluid dynamics